Almost Alice: Music Inspired by the Motion Picture is a 2010 concept album of various artists' music inspired by Tim Burton's film, Alice in Wonderland. The album is also notable for featuring songs that were inspired from quotes directly from Lewis Carroll's original 1865 novel Alice's Adventures in Wonderland. For example, both "The Lobster Quadrille" (by Franz Ferdinand) and "You Are Old, Father William" (by They Might Be Giants) are both word-for-word performances of poems from the original Alice as quoted by the Mock Turtle (the former) and Alice herself to the Caterpillar (the latter). Furthermore, "Very Good Advice" by Robert Smith is a cover of Kathryn Beaumont's "Very Good Advice" from Disney's 1951 animated adaptation of Alice in Wonderland.

The album was released by Buena Vista Records on March 2, 2010. It debuted at No. 5 on the Billboard 200 US albums chart. On June 1, 2010, iTunes released a deluxe edition of the album. The lead single, "Alice" by Avril Lavigne is played during the end credits of Alice in Wonderland and is the only song of the album featured in the film. It premiered on January 27, 2010, on the radio program On Air with Ryan Seacrest. The second single was the song "Tea Party" by Estonian pop singer Kerli. A special edition of the album with three extra songs is exclusive to Hot Topic, though it was also sold online in Mexico by the Mixup Music Store. On June 1, 2010, the special edition was released on iTunes.

Reception

William Ruhlmann of AllMusic focused part of his review on Lavigne's track, "Alice", describing it as "a typical piece of self-assertive adolescent pop/rock", noting that it was "ideally suited for heavy rotation on Radio Disney". Singling out "White Rabbit" and "Very Good Advice" as the album "oddities", Ruhlmann otherwise decided the album was more appealing for children, with nearly all of the songs being "schoolyard chants".

Track listing

Charts

See also
 Muppets: The Green Album
 Nightmare Revisited
 Frankenweenie Unleashed!
 Avengers Assemble

References

2010 compilation albums
Alternative rock compilation albums
Covers albums
Music based on Alice in Wonderland
Psychedelic rock compilation albums
Pop rock compilation albums
Buena Vista Records compilation albums
Concept albums
Alice in Wonderland (franchise)